John Campbell is a Canadian politician, who was elected to Toronto City Council in the 2014 municipal election.

He represented Ward 4 (Etobicoke Centre) from 2014 to 2018.  During his term of office he served on many high-profile council committees and city agencies including the Budget Committee, the Planning Growth Management Committee and the Toronto Transit Commission.
   
Campbell is a graduate of the University of Toronto in political science and economics. He earned an MBA from the Schulich School of Business in finance and strategic management) after four and a half years of evening study in 1999.

He ran for councillor in the newly formed Ward 2 Etobicoke Centre in the 2018 Toronto election and lost by a small margin to Stephen Holyday.

Prior to his election as councillor in 2014, Campbell worked as a sales and marketing consultant, and was a trustee and chair of the Toronto District School Board.

He ran for councillor in Ward 4 (Etobicoke Centre) in the 2010 election, losing narrowly to incumbent councillor Gloria Lindsay Luby.

Electoral record

References

Toronto city councillors
Toronto District School Board trustees
Living people
Year of birth missing (living people)
Place of birth missing (living people)